Canadian special forces can refer to:

 Canadian Special Operations Forces Command (CANSOFCOM)
The current Canadian military special forces, established 2006

 Special Operations Group (Canada) (SOG)
established 2005

 1st Special Service Force, The Devil's Brigade
A joint Canada-USA special forces unit of WWII, Canada's first special forces, established 1942 and disbanded 1944

 Special Emergency Response Team (SERT)
The RCMP's former special forces team, disbanded 1993

 Joint Task Force 2 (JTF2)
A component of CANSOFCOM, and successor to SERT, established 1993

 Canadian Special Operations Regiment (CSOR)
provides the CF with a multi dimensional SOF unit that can be deployed anywhere in Canada or internationally. Focussed primarily on special reconnaissance, direct action, and special warfare.

 The Canadian Airborne Regiment
 Sometimes called Canadian special forces, established in 1968 and disbanded 1995

Special forces of Canada